Centrosomal protein of 135 kDa is a protein that in humans is encoded by the CEP135 gene.
It is part of the centrosome throughout the cell cycle, being distributed in the pericentriolar material. CEP135 is required for the centriolar localization of CEP250.

References

External links
 
 PDBe-KB provides an overview of all the structure information available in the PDB for Human Centrosomal protein of 135 kDa

Further reading

Centrosome